Lu Jun (born March 19, 1959) is an association football referee from China. He supervised two matches in the 2002 FIFA World Cup in South Korea and Japan, one between Croatia and Mexico in Niigata, and another between Poland and the United States in Daejeon. He also officiated the 1991 FIFA Women's World Cup in China, the 2001 FIFA Confederations Cup in Japan and South Korea and the 2000 Olympics.

In 2010, Lu was arrested along with two other referees for accepting bribes and match fixing. He was sentenced to five and a half years in jail in February 2012 after admitting taking bribes worth more than $128,000 (£82,000) to fix the results of seven league games.

References

1959 births
Living people
Chinese football referees
2002 FIFA World Cup referees
Olympic football referees
Sportspeople involved in betting scandals
Association football controversies
Chinese male criminals
People convicted of bribery
FIFA Women's World Cup referees
AFC Asian Cup referees